Frank Schindel (born 2 March 1965) is a German singer.

Biography 

Frank Schindel was born in March 1965 in Karlsruhe. He started playing music and played the guitar at the age of twelve. After reaching the Legal age he moved to Munich and switched to singing in his musical career; amongst other things he started the band Art Pope. He was active as a support for music groups in the field of African American music and jazz music by Johnny Guitar Watson, The Temptations, The Supremes and B.B. King. During this time he built up his own recording studio in Munich.

He often appears as a producer nowadays. In German-speaking countries, he became known in 1999 for his interpretations of the songs by the Japanese artist Kōji Wada in German for the anime of the franchises Digimon, One Piece, Pretty Cure and Yu-Gi-Oh! as well as the series Beyblade V-Force, Detective Conan and Dragonball Z.
Frank Schindel also belongs to the so-called "Anime Allstars" of the album series "Anime Hits", which is published by Sony Music Entertainment.

Schindel is married and has two children. In addition to his music, he works as a sound engineer for television productions such as the DSF show Heads up - Das Sport Duell, where Alexander Müller was the director.

Albums

References

External links
 Official Homepage
 
 
 

1965 births
Living people
Musicians from Karlsruhe
German male singers